Ilanz is a former municipality in the district of Surselva in the Swiss canton of Graubünden. The former municipality of Ilanz was congruent with the town of Ilanz. On 1 January 1978, the former municipality of Strada merged into the new municipality of Ilanz. On 1 January 2014, the municipality of Ilanz and the surrounding municipalities Castrisch, Ladir, Luven, Pitasch, Riein, Ruschein, Schnaus, Sevgein, Duvin, Pigniu, Rueun and Siat merged into the new municipality of Ilanz/Glion.

History
Ilanz is first mentioned in 765 as "Iliande."  Ilanz became the capital of the newly formed Grey League in 1395. The Grey League was the second of the Three Leagues which eventually formed canton Graubünden. Johannes von Ilanz, the Abbot of Disentis, was among the three nobles instrumental in creating this "eternal alliance."

Ilanz has a special place in the history of the Protestant Reformation. In the 1520s, the Diet of Ilanz declared that citizens of the Three Leagues should be free to choose between Catholicism and the Protestant forms of Christianity then rising to the fore.  These and other events resulted in a counter-reformation within the Swiss Confederation that reversed many of the gains of the Reformation in Switzerland.

Geography

Of this area, 24.9% is used for agricultural purposes, while 50.6% is forested. Of the rest of the land, 18.7% is settled (buildings or roads) and the remainder (5.7%) is non-productive (rivers, glaciers or mountains).

It is located in the Ilanz sub-district of the Surselva district. It is the first town on the Rhine; the Rhine headwaters gather here to become the valley of the Vorderrhein.

Illanz is the market town for the surrounding area. It is also the nearest major town to the Weisse Arena ski resort situated just further up the valley. In Ilanz are the major train station, supermarket, and nearest hospital of the area.

The town is situated at a fork of the Surselva and the Vrin/Vals valley, which is split by Piz Mundaun. The neighbouring villages of Ruschein and Ladir are accessed from Ilanz, as well as Vrin, Vals, and Obersaxen.

Demographics
Ilanz had a population (as of 2011) of 2,327. , 15.4% of the population was made up of foreign nationals. Over the last 10 years the population has grown at a rate of 0.8%. Most of the population speaks German (59.3%), with Romansh being the second most common (29.9%).

, the gender distribution of the population was 45.2% male and 54.8% female. The age distribution, in Ilanz is; 247 children or 9.9% of the population are between 0 and 9 years old and 348 teenagers or 14.0% are between 10 and 19. Of the adult population, 306 people, or 12.3% of the population are between 20 and 29 years old. 378 people or 15.2% are between 30 and 39, 347 people, or 13.9% are between 40 and 49, and 285 people or 11.5% are between 50 and 59. The senior population distribution is 208 people or 8.4% of the population are between 60 and 69 years old, 200 people, or 8.0% are between 70 and 79, there are 138 people, or 5.5% who are between 80 and 89 there are 31 people or 1.2% who are between 90 and 99.

In the 2007 federal election, the most popular party was the CVP which received 47.3% of the vote. The next three most popular parties were the SVP (22.7%), the FDP (14.5%), and the SP (12.8%).

The entire Swiss population is generally well-educated. In Ilanz about 67.3% of the population (between ages 25–64) have completed either non-mandatory upper secondary education or additional higher education (either university or a Fachhochschule).

Ilanz has an unemployment rate of 1.44%. , there were 24 people employed in the primary economic sector and about 8 businesses involved in this sector. 550 people are employed in the secondary sector and there are 39 businesses in this sector. 2,073 people are employed in the tertiary sector, with 202 businesses in this sector.

Of the rest of the population,  there are 94 individuals (or about 3.78% of the population) belong to the Orthodox Church, and there are 19 individuals (or about 0.76% of the population) belong to another Christian church. There are 89 (or about 3.58% of the population) who are Islamic. There are 8 individuals (or about 0.32% of the population) who belong to another church (not listed on the census), 76 (or about 3.05% of the population) belong to no church, are agnostic or atheist, and 63 individuals (or about 2.53% of the population) did not answer the question.

The historical population is given in the following table:

 Population includes Strada

Politics

Weather
Ilanz has an average of 112.6 days of rain per year and on average receives  of precipitation. During this month there is precipitation for an average of 11.4 days. The month with the most days of precipitation is June, with an average of 11.5, but with only  of precipitation.

Heritage sites of national significance

The Church of St. Margreta and the Church of St. Martin are listed as Swiss heritage sites of national significance.

Other sites
The ruins of Grüneck Castle (Ruine Grüneck), destroyed before 1544, are visible today. A Carolingian hoard of two ornately decorated salt containers and coins was discovered near the ruins of the castle in 1811. One of the containers, which is made from antler and is T-shaped, is now kept in the British Museum. A hoard of forty Carolingian gold coins, including nine deniers, known as the Ilanz Hoard was discovered near the castle in 1904. In addition to the Carolingian coins, the horde contained Lombard and Arab coins. About 142 coins from discoveries near the castle are kept at the Rätisches Museum in Chur.

Notable people 
 Donat Cadruvi (1923–1998) a Swiss lawyer, politician, and Romansh-language writer. He was a member of the Swiss National Council 1963–1971 and Mayor of Ilanz 1975–1978
 Corina Casanova (born 1956 in Ilanz) the Federal Chancellor of Switzerland between 2008 and 2015
 Serafin Wiestner (born 1990 in Ilanz) a Swiss biathlete, he competed in the 2014 Winter Olympics

Sociology 
American university professor Robert H. Billigmeier spent his sabbaticals in Ilanz. Fluent in both German and Romansch, he was deeply interested in multiculturalism and authored several books, including the nationally acclaimed, Crisis in Swiss Pluralism, published in 1979. He was of German and Swiss origin with his maternal ancestry tracing back to Strada (now part of Ilanz/Glion).

References

External links
Official website 

Cities in Switzerland
Cultural property of national significance in Graubünden
Populated places on the Rhine
Ilanz/Glion
Former municipalities of Graubünden